Gibberula infundibulum is a species of sea snail, a marine gastropod mollusk, in the family Cystiscidae.

Distribution
This species occurs in the Indian Ocean off Somalia.

References

External links
 MNHN, Paris: holotype

Endemic fauna of Somalia
infundibulum
Gastropods described in 1994